Maekawa's algorithm is an algorithm for mutual exclusion on a distributed system. The basis of this algorithm is a quorum like approach where any one site needs only to seek permissions from a subset of other sites.

Algorithm

Terminology 
 A site is any computing device which runs the Maekawa's Algorithm
 For any one request of entering the critical section:
 The requesting site is the site which is requesting to enter the critical section.
 The receiving site is every other site which is receiving the request from the requesting site.
 ts refers to the local time stamp of the system according to its logical clock.

Algorithm
Requesting site:
 A requesting site  sends a message  to all sites in its quorum set .

Receiving site:
 Upon reception of a  message, the receiving site  will:
 If site  does not have an outstanding  message (that is, a  message that has not been released), then site  sends a  message to site .
 If site  has an outstanding  message with a process with higher priority than the request, then site  sends a  message to site  and site  queues the request from site .
 If site  has an outstanding  message with a process with lower priority than the request, then site  sends an  message to the process which has currently been granted access to the critical section by site . (That is, the site with the outstanding  message.)
 Upon reception of a  message, the site  will:
 Send a  message to site  if and only if site  has received a  message from some other site or if  has sent a yield to some other site but have not received a new .
 Upon reception of a  message, site  will:
 Send a  message to the request on the top of its own request queue. Note that the requests at the top are the highest priority.
 Place  into its request queue.
 Upon reception of a  message, site  will:
 Delete  from its request queue.
 Send a  message to the request on the top of its request queue.

Critical section:

Quorum set:
A quorum set must abide by the following properties:
 
 
 
 Site  is contained in exactly  request sets

Therefore:

Performance
 Number of network messages;  to 
 Synchronization delay: 2 message propagation delays
 The algorithm can deadlock without protections in place.

See also
 Lamport's bakery algorithm
 Lamport's Distributed Mutual Exclusion Algorithm
 Ricart–Agrawala algorithm
 Raymond's algorithm

References

 M. Maekawa, "A √N algorithm for mutual exclusion in decentralized systems”, ACM 
Transactions in Computer Systems, vol. 3., no. 2., pp. 145–159, 1985.
 Mamoru Maekawa, Arthur E. Oldehoeft, Rodney R. Oldehoeft (1987). Operating Systems: Advanced Concept. Benjamin/Cummings Publishing Company, Inc.
 B. Sanders (1987). The Information Structure of Distributed Mutual Exclusion Algorithms. ACM Transactions on Computer Systems, Vol. 3, No. 2, pp. 145–59.

Concurrency control algorithms